The National Forest Workers' Union of Japan (Zenrinya) was a trade union representing workers in the forestry and timber industries in Japan.

The union was founded in 1959, and affiliated to the General Council of Trade Unions of Japan.  By 1967, it had 64,911 members.  In 1989, it merged with a rival union, to form the Japanese Federation of Forest and Wood Workers' Union.

References

Timber industry trade unions
Trade unions established in 1959
Trade unions disestablished in 1989
Trade unions in Japan